Storme is a given name and a surname. It may refer to:

Given name
 Stormé DeLarverie (1920–2014), American gay civil rights icon and entertainer whose scuffle with police may have sparked the Stonewall riots
 Storme Toolis (born 1992), British disabled actress
 Storme Warren, 21st century American television and radio broadcaster
 Storme Webber (born 1959), American artist, poet, curator and educator

Surname
 James Storme (born 1943), Belgian footballer and later manager
 Lucien Storme (1916–1945), Belgian professional road bicycle racer
 Marcel Storme (1930–2018), Belgian lawyer and politician
 Matthias Storme (born 1959), Belgian lawyer, academic and conservative philosopher
 Roland Storme (born 1934), Belgian footballer

See also
 Storm (given name)
 Storm (surname)